Edgar Rolando Olivares Burgoa (born January 26, 1977 in Cochabamba) is a Bolivian retired football midfielder.

Club career
He currently plays for Universitario de Sucre in the Bolivian First Division.

International career
He represented his country in four FIFA World Cup qualification matches.

References

External links

1977 births
Living people
Sportspeople from Cochabamba
Bolivian footballers
Bolivia international footballers
Association football midfielders
C.D. Jorge Wilstermann players
Club Bolívar players
The Strongest players
La Paz F.C. players
Universitario de Sucre footballers
Club Aurora players